The Texas Flood World Tour was a concert tour in North America and Western Europe, undertaken by American blues rock band Stevie Ray Vaughan and Double Trouble in 1983 and 1984. The band had released their debut album, Texas Flood, a week before the tour began.

The first leg of the tour took the band through the United States and Canada, and then on to Europe where they toured for two weeks. They then returned to North America where, during a leg that lasted more than three months, Vaughan and Double Trouble opened for Men at Work and The Moody Blues. The tour concluded in the Mid-Atlantic. The band returned to the studio in January 1984. The tour resumed the following month. The final leg incorporated return stops to several cities, and a visit to Hawaii, before the band returned home in late February.

The tour provided the band with widespread exposure and was a commercial success. Vaughn continued to tour in the ensuing seven years before his death in a helicopter crash in August 1990.

Background

Vaughan was one of two children born to Jimmie Lee "Big Jim" and Martha Jean Vaughan. His brother Jimmie Lawrence Vaughan was born March 20, 1951; Stevie (Stephen Ray Vaughan) was born on October 3, 1954, in Dallas. His brother began to teach himself to play the guitar when he was twelve. Vaughan observed him intently, and his musical education was aided by exposure to his brother's constant practicing and playing. According to Vaughan, "he made up three songs the first day. He didn't have to try. It just came out". Steve Stevenson, a family friend, noticed that within a few days Jimmie was able to demonstrate what he had learned.

Vaughan was playing the guitar by the time he was seventeen. In that year, 1972, he brought his band Blackbird to Austin to play at the Rolling Hills Country Club, and later at the Soap Creek Saloon. Vaughan then joined a band called Krackerjack for a three-month stint. He had accepted offers from several local bands, but within six years of arriving in Austin, Vaughan and his own group, Double Trouble, were playing at the Rome Inn. Among those present was Manor Downs accountant, and future business partner, Edi Johnson who remembered, "I'm not an authority on music—it's whatever turned me on—but this did". After an appearance before record producer Jerry Wexler, Vaughan and Double Trouble were invited to the Montreux Jazz Festival in 1982. The audience disliked the band's music and booed their performance. Vaughan and Double Trouble met Jackson Browne the following night. He offered them free use of his personal studio in Los Angeles where they recorded a full-length album in November 1982.

As the band gave several performances toward year's end, they began to be noticed by music industry representatives. At the end of a two-night stand in Austin, Vaughan and Double Trouble earned more than $7,000 for their efforts. The group signed with Epic Records. The label's approval encouraged Vaughan to pursue further opportunities. On a trip to New York, Vaughan and Double Trouble were the opening act at a Bryan Adams concert.

Tour itinerary

Preparations
In a memorandum to executives at the southwest branch of Epic written before the tour, marketing Vice President Jack Chase agreed to break Vaughan and Double Trouble out of Texas. After a branch meeting he said: "The prize is having Stevie Ray Vaughn [sic] on our label and in your bags to promote and sell". Chase said it was his duty to break Vaughan nationally, otherwise "the pride in selling a 'Men at Work' is long gone". He went on to describe Vaughan as a "remarkable artist". Author Craig Hopkins has suggested that the success of Texas Flood was largely dependent on Chase's expertise in breaking a new artist: "John Hammond has received the most accolades [for the album's success], but without Jack Chase, the record might have been just another of those grapes withering on the vine", according to Hopkins. However, there is no evidence to suggest that Hammond was less involved in the making of the band's subsequent studio albums; it seems that he trusted Vaughan's abilities as an artist.

Chase wanted Vaughan and the band to begin touring as soon as possible—the longer the album took to breakout, the more competition it would face. The itinerary he initially planned included the Eastern and Southwestern United States. The additional legs were only added after the growing international success of Texas Flood. The plan was for the band to begin the tour performing nationwide then tour Western Europe. They would headline theater dates in Texas playing for their immediate statewide fan base. Agents Rick Alter and Alex Hodges provided marketing assistance. Their philosophies and techniques in the major markets led to the band eventually performing arena tours, which enabled them to earn bonuses for reaching specific ticket sales plateaus.

Vaughan and Double Trouble prepared for the tour by performing showcases in Dallas and Houston. These were attended by various musicians, radio station personalities, disc jockeys, record store owners, music critics, and record company executives. The band also made promotional appearances. On tour, even during the busiest traveling days, they would fit these into their daily schedule. The band would later find them exhausting. Before the tour could begin, Vaughan and Double Trouble needed the support of radio stations, Dallas' Q102-FM in particular. At first disc jockey Redbeard received only negative reactions from listeners when he played the album. Nevertheless, he persevered and played Texas Flood for an additional two weeks leading to more album sales in the Southwest. At least 15,000 units were shipped to record stores.

Opening leg (June–August 1983)
The tour began on June 22, 1983. On the second night Vaughan developed laryngitis, requiring the cancellation of three performances. He used this time to rest his throat. In Philadelphia, on July 8, the band played at Ripley Music Hall and recorded the show for a radio show broadcast. The next stop was Providence, where they appeared before a capacity audience. The group moved on to New York, where they performed for another packed house in Rochester.

The next extended stop was in Canada. Vaughan and Double Trouble played four concerts including a July 20 appearance at the El Mocambo in Toronto. From there the band took their newly purchased tour bus back to New York, where they played additional concerts. One of the concerts was organized by tennis players Vitas Gerulaitis and John McEnroe as a benefit for the Special Olympics. A review of the concert described it as "one of the lightest turnouts of the season", adding that Gerulaitis and McEnroe "still cannot lure hordes of teenagers to a concert, even a benefit for a worthy cause". However, the review praised the band: "The concert opened strongly with the ubiquitous Texas guitarist Stevie Ray Vaughan leading his trio Double Trouble through a workmanlike set of blues and boogie-woogie."

The group proceeded to the Northeast, Mid-Atlantic, Midwest and East South Central regions of the US. Returning to Canada, they reached Montreal, where they performed before over 38,000 people, at the Olympic Stadium. The concert also featured The Police, Talking Heads and Peter Tosh, earning nearly $700,000 in gross revenue. The band proceeded through the west and Midwestern U.S., an area that encompassed Michigan, Illinois, Colorado and California, arriving in Grand Rapids, on August 11. After two performances at ChicagoFest with opening act Buddy Guy and Junior Wells, ("I'll open for them", Vaughan told his agent Rick Alter), Vaughan and Double Trouble gave a performance as the warm-up for Sammy Hagar on August 19. In late August the band departed for England.

Europe (August–September 1983)
On August 27, 1983, Vaughan and Double Trouble arrived in England. The band hoped for a positive reception from the crowd at the Reading Rock Festival in the county of Berkshire. However, in a lineup with mainly hard rock and heavy metal artists, Vaughan and the band stood out and were not received well by the audience, some of whom began throwing bottles of urine. One person who took particular note of this was the band's road crew member Byron Barr, whose journal records the reaction in demeaning terms: "Played Reading Festival. People were rude bastards. They threw bottles full of piss & all kinds of rude shit." Uber Rock writer Andy P's own recollection, written in 2014, was similar: "He kinda stuck out a bit like a sore thumb and like Steel Pulse the day before he caught the attention of the bottle throwers. Unlike Steel Pulse who ended their set early with bottles clanging off their steel drums he persisted with real flair asking the crowd politely, 'I know it's fun but put a stop to it'."

On August 31 the band traveled to Paris for two shows. There they received their first gold records from the Canadian Recording Industry Association (CRIA) for selling 50,000 copies of Texas Flood. In Paris they also visited the famous Eiffel Tower, then the Arc de Triomphe—"...where Hitler marched through on horseback. Pretty scary to think that all that shit happened just 40 years or so ago", wrote Barr in his journal. A further concert was played in Berlin on September 4 at a nightclub in the borough of Kreuzberg. The next day Vaughan and Double Trouble's first German television appearance was broadcast—a brief interview with Vaughan and a performance of four songs from Texas Flood. The interview featured a male and female host. The male host asked questions in English, and the female host translated Vaughan's responses into German. Hopkins comments that the female host came out wearing Vaughan's trademark flat-brim hat, which he did not appear to find humorous. On September 8 the band arrived in London.

Vaughan and Double Trouble's first London show was at The Venue on Victoria Street. They were advertised as a "special guest at the Reading Rock Festival" with their "new album Texas Flood". The group's London performance proved successful; according to The Guardian, Vaughan's "technique and command are something quite extraordinary". This was, as former bandmate Billy Alford put it, "just a major drug fest". Referring to Vaughan's escalating substance abuse, Alford said, "I knew he was going to be a star, that he had it. It was just a matter of timing and whether he would kill himself before he got there." The final European concert was performed on September 9 at the Paradiso in Amsterdam. The band then returned to the U.S. for a tour of the East Coast.

North America (September–December 1983)
On September 14 Vaughan and Double Trouble arrived in Norfolk, where they played at The Boathouse; a few days later they played an awards show held by WSHE in Miami. The band's agent Rick Alter was sufficiently confident of their career status to announce the group's appearance at concerts at Houston Music Hall, Austin City Coliseum and the Bronco Bowl in Dallas in early October. An advertisement for the Dallas concert included the phrase "the triumphant return of Stevie Ray Vaughan and Double Trouble". The main reason for their return to Texas was to play celebratory homecoming concerts for Vaughan's immediate fan base in the state. He had performed extensively on the Texas club circuit for nearly a decade. Vaughan featured  guitarist Eric Johnson as the warm-up act for each show.

Manager Chesley Millikin had been effusive with his praise in a letter to Epic's Jack Chase, dated October 12. He wrote that the band would not have had the chance to breakout nationally without the benefit of Epic's marketing efforts. He confirmed that Vaughan and Double Trouble would soon return to the studio, and learned that Texas Flood was approaching sales of 300,000 units. According to Alex Hodges, one of the band's agents, many people disliked the idea of them performing in an upcoming tour with The Moody Blues. He reckoned that both bands had a common thread in musical genre, however, and accordingly organized concerts for October through December, which were deemed a success. Hodges apparently "didn't have any doubt" in Vaughan's ability to command the audience. During a short hiatus in mid-December, the band turned their attention briefly from performing to composing. Among other compositions, they finished two instrumentals, which were incorporated into the closing shows of the year, which they completed during a return appearance in Norfolk.

United States (February 1984)
The band traveled to New York City for two-and-a-half weeks. The band played no concerts during this period although there were recording sessions scheduled at the Power Station with John Hammond. Drummer Chris Layton was effusive about Hammond's presence during the sessions; Hammond, he said, "was kind of like a nice hand on your shoulder", and: "he was a feedback person". Layton called him "our gyroscope", and praised his keen ability to identify keeper takes and eliminate over processing.

The recordings made by Vaughan and Double Trouble during these sessions were released as Couldn't Stand the Weather, the band's second studio album. On February 4, the band left New York for Nashville. They played a concert there at the Nashville Municipal Auditorium, appearing at the tenth-annual Volunteer Jam, an event organized by Charlie Daniels. They moved on to Knoxville where they performed at Alumni Memorial Gym on the University of Tennessee campus. The band traveled to Georgia, arriving in Atlanta on February 8, where they did two shows at the Moonshadow Saloon. During the first performance, Vaughan paused during their set and asked an unruly patron to leave the venue, one of the few times he called out a disruptive patron.

The tour through the Midwest continued, with concerts in Missouri and Illinois. Less than a week after the band left Chicago, a 28-year-old man named Willie M. "Wimp" Stokes, Jr., the son of a drug kingpin, was shot and killed at a motel there. Austin musician Bill Carter read about the incident in a local newspaper and wrote the song "Willie the Wimp". He recorded a demo of the song that he gave to Vaughan, who later included his version on the band's live album, Live Alive. Resuming the tour, the band reached Honolulu on February 25 where they closed the tour as the warm-up for The Police at Aloha Stadium.

Reception

Commercial
The band had survived a few setbacks, including three canceled shows which were rescheduled due to Vaughan's laryngitis. The full extent of the tour's earnings and expenses was not highly publicized. Hopkins confirms the band had averaged $500 to $950 per show before the release of Texas Flood, but this had grown to $1,500 by the beginning of the tour. After four months on the road, during the Moody Blues tour in October–December 1983, the band received $5,000 per show, an amount that included additional bonuses dependent on ticket sale plateaus. Layton stated that, "I could actually pay my rent and keep my lights turned on and have money to eat on and put gas in my car—that was our real priority in life." He later recounted that the year before they had "very little money" and were "basically broke".

At times, the shows were packed to capacity; in August 1983, near the end of the first North American excursion, the group's performance at The Palace in Los Angeles was a sellout. "As we were pulling up to the club, there was a line all the way around the block," recalled Shannon. Two months later, aftertheir success in Europe, Vaughan and Double Trouble received a portion of the near $75,000 in ticket sale revenue, following an appearance opening for Men at Work in Seattle. However, in December of that year, after the Moody Blues tour concluded, they returned to performing in smaller theaters—they sold out the Beacon Theatre on December 28. The following year, after studio duties were completed, Vaughan and Double Trouble earned a percentage of the near $155,000 gross revenue after their performance in Nashville. The stability of the band's career meant they could enjoy making their living by playing music.

Critical response and creative development
In terms of critical reception, while there were some mixed reactions, Vaughan and Double Trouble were generally well received. The band was now known throughout the United States, Canada and Europe. As well as encounters with other musical celebrities, the group now had the ability to share the stage with their musical influences; the tour represented, for them, an indicator of success. However, these advantages had been gained at a price; Shannon, in retrospect, noted the stress and strain on the band. They had succumbed to "everything you'd want, [which was] right there—and for a long time it was fun". However, Vaughan's friend Lew Stokes, while also expressing concerns, concludes that, despite Vaughan's substance abuse, his moral compass remained, and the way he treated people had never wavered. The tour confirmed Vaughan's mastery of the electric guitar. This was evidenced in his hometown, on June 16, when a number of radio VIPs attended the Texas Flood record release party. They were frankly skeptical about Vaughan's performance skills, believing them to be feasible only in the studio.

Four songs Vaughan and Double Trouble composed at the end of 1983 were included on their next album, Couldn't Stand the Weather. A number of songs were outtakes, including an instrumental and a lyrical piece. The released works include two instrumentals "Scuttle Buttin'" and "Stang's Swang", and two lyrical pieces "Couldn't Stand the Weather" and "Honey Bee". Vaughan's creative progress is reflected in the songs released on Couldn't Stand the Weather, which, according to Hopkins, quickly outpaced the sales of Texas Flood. The album includes Vaughan's first attempt at instrumental jazz, "Stang's Swang".

Aftermath
Despite his earnings from the tour, Vaughan and his wife Lenny continued to live in their modest house in Austin. However, travel and public appearances dominated the next two years of Vaughan's life. In March 1984 the band was on tour again, this time around North America, Europe, Australasia and Japan, remaining on the road until May 1985. In June Vaughan and Double Trouble left for another tour—with Reese Wynans who was now the band's keyboardist. They were away for over ten months, and took a break in May 1986, to change their management team. A second visit to Europe, from September until October 1986, was the last of the exhaustive touring schedule. Vaughan's new personal assistant, Timothy Duckworth, had concerns about his escalating substance abuse. This ultimately threatened Vaughan's life—and now threatened Shannon's, who was also immersed by addiction.

Typical Setlist

 "Testify" (The Isley Brothers cover)
 "So Excited"
 "Voodoo Child (Slight Return)" (The Jimi Hendrix Experience cover)
"Pride and Joy"
"The Things (That) I Used to Do" (Guitar Slim cover) or "Tin Pan Alley" (Bob Geddins cover)
 "Mary Had a Little Lamb" (Buddy Guy cover)
"Love Struck Baby"
 "Texas Flood" (Larry Davis cover)
 "Tell Me" (Howlin' Wolf cover)
 "Little Wing" (The Jimi Hendrix Experience cover)
 "Third Stone From the Sun" (The Jimi Hendrix Experience cover)
Encore:
"Lenny"
 "Rude Mood"
 "Testify" (Reprise) or "Wham!" (Lonnie Mack cover) or "Manic Depression" (The Jimi Hendrix Experience cover)

Tour dates

See also
Texas Flood
Couldn't Stand the Weather Tour
Stevie Ray Vaughan live performances

References

Sources

Stevie Ray Vaughan concert tours
1983 concert tours
1984 concert tours